NGC 236 is a spiral galaxy located in the constellation Pisces. It was discovered on August 3, 1864 by Albert Marth.

References

External links
 

0236
Spiral galaxies
Pisces (constellation)
002596